Austin Hogan (19 September 1901 – 10 March 1982) was an Australian rules footballer who played for the Fitzroy Football Club in the Victorian Football League (VFL).

Notes

External links 
		

1901 births
1982 deaths
Australian rules footballers from Victoria (Australia)
Fitzroy Football Club players